Imal Liyanage (born 22 April 1994) is a Sri Lankan-born cricketer who plays for the Qatar national cricket team. He played five first-class and eight List A matches in domestic tournaments in Sri Lanka. He made his Twenty20 debut for Tamil Union Cricket and Athletic Club in the 2015-16 AIA Premier T20 Tournament on 22 December 2015. In February 2020, he was named in Qatar's team for their three-match Twenty20 International (T20I) series against Uganda. He made his T20I debut for Qatar, against Uganda, on 12 February 2020. In October 2021, he was named in Qatar's squad for the Group A matches in the 2021 ICC Men's T20 World Cup Asia Qualifier.

References

External links
 

1994 births
Living people
Cricketers from Colombo
Qatari cricketers
Qatar Twenty20 International cricketers
Sri Lankan cricketers
Badureliya Sports Club cricketers
Tamil Union Cricket and Athletic Club cricketers
Sri Lankan emigrants to Qatar
Sri Lankan expatriate sportspeople in Qatar